The Indiana Colony refers to a group of Indiana residents who settled the area known today as Pasadena, California. The group was incorporated on January 31, 1874, by Indiana residents who sought warmer weather after the exceptionally cold winter of 1872–73. The settlers met in the home of Thomas Elliott, and Daniel Berry was selected to visit Southern California with a direction to find suitable land at a suitable price.

Berry visited San Diego, Anaheim, San Fernando, Rancho Santa Anita and Rancho San Pascual. After meeting Judge Benjamin Eaton and Benjamin Davis "Don Benito" Wilson, he was able to negotiate the purchase of lands in the eastern part of Rancho San Pascual near the Arroyo Seco. The recession of 1873 caused a few initial investors to withdraw from the settlement plans. Berry immediately reincorporated the company into the Southern California Orange Grove Association, enlisting any interested parties and salvaging the purchasing power of the settlement.

The nearly  property would become The Indiana Colony, the genesis of present-day Pasadena, California.

Reason for moving

In 1873 the Midwest had been hit by its hardest winter in history, leading many of those in Indianapolis to long for a warmer climate and an environment where they could live among citrus groves and perennial flowers. With the laying of the Transcontinental Railroad in 1869, the idea of moving west became more possible and affordable. It was at the home of Dr. and Mrs. Thomas Elliott that a group of neighbors, including Mrs. Elliot's brother, Daniel M. Berry, first discussed the idea of going west.

Berry was a former teacher become journalist who had a great interest in his brother-in-law's granary. He was also an asthmatic and the Midwestern weather went hard on him. He contacted Harris Newmark, who had recently purchased Rancho Santa Anita, and was able to get pertinent information on the southland. Newmark even stopped by Indianapolis and gave a first-hand account of California to the Elliotts et al. From that meeting the Hoosiers formed "The California Colony of Indiana". It took little time to fill the limited roll of the organization's membership.

Next was the task of investigating the California properties.

Selection of territory

From a committee of four it was Daniel Berry who was left to set off to scout land in Southern California for the group of Indianapolis investors. He visited five regions: San Diego, Anaheim, San Fernando, Rancho Santa Anita and Rancho San Pascual. He was given a budgetary target of $5 per acre with which to negotiate.

San Diego seemed an ideal spot and the price was right, but a series of windmills would have had to be set up to pump water. The Company rejected the idea. He determined San Bernardino to be too hot. In Anaheim he didn't care for the superabundance of fleas nor the number of "musketers" (gun toters). Of San Fernando, he said the price at $2 per acre was acceptable, but the area was only good for growing grain. There was too little access to water for citrus growing. The Indianans had their hearts set on orchards. Rancho Santa Anita was the collective lands of today's Arcadia, Monrovia, Duarte, El Monte, and Baldwin Park. The property had absolutely everything required for citrus growing, but was too expensive at $20 per acre.

On September 12, 1873, Berry met Judge Benjamin Eaton, who represented Dr. John S. Griffin of the Fair Oaks Ranch (near east Altadena) on Rancho San Pascual where Berry had his first good night's sleep in years. He fell in love with Rancho San Pascual, and to keep his find a secret, he attached a cryptic name to the place as "Muscat" for the grapes that were grown so abundantly over the hillsides.

Southern California Orange Grove Assoc.

The land was being offered for $10 per acre, but there was indecision between Dr. Griffin and Benjamin Wilson on dividing properties. Berry wrote Elliott requesting the money to purchase what he could of Rancho San Pascual. The mail turnaround response was two weeks; it was September 19 before the word got to Indiana. The Company decided to come closer to the asking price of Santa Anita with an offer of $15 per acre. This negotiation was never destined for success. For one, the owner Newmark was not at home; two, the N. Y. Stock Market had been struck by a panic and ruined the financial plans for the Indiana Colony.

Elliott retained a few of the original investors and forwarded only $200 as a down payment on $25,000 of Muscat property. Berry turned promoter and selectively enlisted more investors into the company under a new California incorporation, "The Southern California Orange Grove Association". He sold 100 shares at $250 per share and salvaged the purchasing power of the company.

As Griffin and Wilson settled their land divisions, the association negotiated for a strip of  near the Arroyo Seco. Griffin offered an additional , which he acquired from Wilson free of charge and taxes, to the Colony as well. It was considered a gesture of good faith, but actually, it was the sloughing of what was considered to be worthless highland property that would one day become Altadena. The lower tract of land would become The Indiana Colony.

Renaming the colony

The name lasted until townspeople wanted their own post office. Up to this time, the mail was being brought up from Los Angeles by one resident's son who was going to school there. Mail for the colony came to Los Angeles earmarked for "Indiana Colony," but when the community applied for a post office, the Postmaster General rejected the name Indiana Colony. Thus began the search for a new name for the town which would end up being Pasadena.

See also
Colonel Jabez Banbury

References

External links
Early Pasadena History 

Populated places established in 1874
History of Pasadena, California
19th-century colonization of the Americas
San Gabriel Valley
1874 establishments in California